The 2005 New Mexico State Aggies football team represented New Mexico State University in the 2005 NCAA Division I-A football season. The Aggies were coached by head coach Hal Mumme and played their home games at Aggie Memorial Stadium in Las Cruces, New Mexico. They participated as members of the Western Athletic Conference.

Schedule

References

New Mexico State
New Mexico State Aggies football seasons
College football winless seasons
New Mexico State Aggies football